was a Japanese samurai of the Sengoku period who was a retainer of the Akechi clan.

Samurai
1562 births
1626 deaths